= Operation Flounder =

Operation Flounder was an operation carried out in World War II by the NEI. Eight men, all NEI, were put on shore at Ceram Island. Contact was lost. It later emerged that at least two had been executed.
